Brandvlei Dam is an earth-fill type dam on the Lower Brandvlei River in Western Cape, South Africa. It was completed in 1983 and the inlet is the Holsloot River.

See also
List of reservoirs and dams in South Africa
List of rivers of South Africa

References 

 List of South African Dams from the Department of Water Affairs

Dams in South Africa